A one-way pair, one-way couple, or couplet refers to that portion of a bi-directional traffic facilitysuch as a road, bus, streetcar, or light rail linewhere its opposing flows exist as two independent and roughly parallel facilities.

Description
In the context of roads, a one-way pair consists of two one-way streets whose flows combine on one or both ends into a single two-way street. The one-way streets may be separated by just a single block, such as in a grid network, or may be spaced further apart with intermediate parallel roads. 

One use of a one-way pair is to increase the vehicular capacity of a major route through a developed area such as a central business district. If not carefully treated with other traffic calming features, the benefit in vehicular capacity is offset by a potential for increased road user deaths, in particular people walking and biking. A one-way pair can be created by converting segments of two-way streets into one-way streets, which allows lanes to be added without widening.

On occasion, "couplet" has been applied specifically to the point where the one-way streets and the two-way street meet, rather than the paired one-way streets themselves.

Flows on a one-way pair may follow the traffic handedness convention of the locale, or may be switched. Following the convention allows a one-way pair to be more easily integrated into an existing network of two-way streets, as a single two-way street is effectively split into the two sides of the pair, as in the diagram below:

Examples

Australia
Sydney CBD features a number of one way pairs, all north-south. One example is Pitt Street with Castlereagh Street. Pitt street carries only northbound traffic from Goulbern Street to Market Street. Castlreagh Street only carries southbound traffic on its entire length from Hunter Street to Hay Street near central station. Trams once ran from Central Station to Circular Quay along Pitt Street and back to Central Station along Castlereigh, Bligh, Bent and Loftus Streets.

In Redfern, part of Elizabeth Street is paired with Chalmers street. This follows the usual flow convention.

In the Brisbane CBD Ann Street is paired with Turbot Street and George Street with North Quay, the latter by the Brisbane River. In Southbank, Merivale Street is paired with Cordelia Street from Montague Road to Vulture Street. In East Brisbane, Vulture Street is paired with Stanley Street.

In the Hobart CBD a couplet of Davey Street and Macquarie Street traverse the length of the city centre. The Tasman Highway joins the pair at the northeastern end at an interchange with the Brooker Highway. This current alignment was implemented in 1987 to coincide with the completion of the Sheraton Hotel. It was originally intended that the couplet system would serve as a stop gap measure prior to the construction of a freeway in Hobart's Transportation study of 1965. Prior to this, all traffic in Hobart was 2-way.

Japan
Japan National Route 340 travels through the central part of Hachinohe in Aomori Prefecture as a one-way pair between its northern terminus at an intersection with Japan National Route 45 and Aomori Prefecture Route 251.

United States
Interstate 78 travels along a one-way pair of surface streets, 12th Street and 14th Street, in Jersey City, New Jersey, between the end of the New Jersey Turnpike Newark Bay Extension and the Holland Tunnel, which leads into New York City, New York.

There are hundreds of one-way pairs among the streets and avenues of New York City. One example is Fifth Avenue with Madison Avenue. Others include First Avenue with Second Avenue; Third Avenue with Lexington Avenue; and Seventh Avenue with either Sixth Avenue or Eighth Avenue.

Two major streets in the city of Pittsburgh serve as a one-way pair; Forbes Avenue and Fifth Avenue. Both streets begin in Downtown near Point State Park before becoming a one-way pair just east of Market Square, with Forbes serving outbound traffic and Fifth serving inbound traffic, going through Uptown and Oakland before both streets end up with two-way traffic and diverge, with Fifth Avenue eventually terminating in Highland Park, while Forbes terminates in Wilkinsburg just outside the city limits. The mostly two-way Boulevard of the Allies parallels Forbes and Fifth for most of the time the two streets are a one-way pair.

The east side of Portland, Oregon, features a number of one-way pairs, both north–south and east–west, with the east–west pairs being associated with bridges; these all follow the usual flow convention – see Transportation in Portland, Oregon, for more details. By contrast, the Portland Transit Mall, which is a public transportation (bus and rail) corridor, has the opposite flow, with the westernmost component (6th Avenue) running north, with the eastern component (5th Avenue) running south.

There are a number of one-way pairs in Downtown Los Angeles, California.  These include 3rd and 4th Streets, 5th and 6th Streets, 8th and 9th Streets, 11th and 12th Streets, and Main and Spring Streets.

Levick Street and Robbins Street in Philadelphia are considered a one-way pair. The streets carry traffic to and from the Tacony-Palmyra Bridge through the Mayfair and Wissinoming neighborhoods. Between Frankford Avenue and Roosevelt Boulevard, the streets carry US 13 in their respective direction.

In Orlando, Florida, Princeton Street carries 4 miles of SR-438 near Interstate 4. Over a portion of that, Smith Street carries the westbound traffic. At Lake Lawsona, Mills Avenue splits into Jackson Street northbound and Thornton Avenue southbound.

In Virginia Beach, Virginia, the eastern end of Interstate 264 transitions to 21st and 22nd Street, each going in its respective direction.

See also

Directional running, the equivalent for rail transport

References

Types of roads